Chaz (less frequently Chas or Chazz) is an English masculine given name or nickname, originally derived from a short form of Charles (abbreviated Chas.), although it is also used occasionally as a short form of other given names such as Chastity or Charlton. Notable people referred to by this name include the following:

People

Charles Chaz I'Anson (born 1986), English rugby league player
Chester "Chaz" Bennington (1976–2017), American singer, songwriter, musician, and actor
Chaz Bono (born 1969), American writer, musician, and actor
Chaz Brenchley (born 1959), British novel and short story writer
Chaz Carr (born 1982), Jamaican former basketball player
Chaz Davies (born 1987), Welsh motorcycle racer and 2011 World Supersport champion
Chaz Ebert (born 1952), American attorney and businesswoman
Chaz Green (born 1992), American football player
Charles Chaz Jankel (born 1952), English musician
DJ Chaz Meads (Charles Meads) (born 1959), American musician, radio DJ and hospitality worker
Chaz Mee, a pen name of Katy Munger (born 1956), American writer
Chaz Mostert (born 1992), Australian racing driver
Chaz Mulkey (born 1981, American Muay Thai kickboxer
Chazz Palminteri (born 1952), American actor, screenwriter and producer
Chaz Robinson (American football) (born 1992), American football player
Chaz Roe (born 1986), American Major League Baseball pitcher
Chaz Lamar Shepherd (born 1977), American actor
Chazeray Chaz Schilens (born 1985), American football player
Chaz Thorne (born 1975), Canadian actor and director
Charles "Chaz" Warrington (born 1971), American professional wrestler under the ring name Mosh
 Chaz 'Charles' Johnson (Born 1948) Canadian Singer
 Chas McCormick (born 1995), outfielder for the Houston Astros baseball team

Fictional characters
Chaz Ashley, the protagonist of the video game Phantasy Star IV: The End of the Millennium
Chaz McFreely, arrogant stuntman from the video game My Sims
Chaz Finster, a character from Rugrats.

See also

Chal (name)
Char (name)
Chazz (name)
Capitol Hill Autonomous Zone (CHAZ)
Chas (disambiguation)

References

English masculine given names
Lists of people by nickname
Hypocorisms